Santa-Maria-di-Lota is a commune in the Haute-Corse department of France on the island of Corsica.

Demographics

Population

Religion
The principal religion practiced is Catholicism.

History
Santa-Maria-di-Lota was once called Santa Maria del Mandriale.

Politics
Guy Armanet has been mayor of the town since 2008. Before him, Henri Sisco, of the Radical Party of the Left, served as mayor from 1978 to 2008.

See also
Communes of the Haute-Corse department

References

Communes of Haute-Corse